Albert Henry Hill (1913–1984) was an American architect.

Hill was born England to American parents. His mother was Anita Jeffress-Hill. His mother and her children moved back to the US and settled in Berkeley, California near the Claremont hotel.  He studied architecture at the University of California, Berkeley graduating in 1936 and at Harvard's Graduate School of Design, where he worked under Walter Gropius. After earning his master's degree in architecture in 1938, he returned to the Bay Area, joining the office of John Ekin Dinwiddie in San Francisco and making partner in 1939. During World War II Hill served as a captain in the U.S. Army Corps of Engineers. When the war ended, he rejoined Dinwiddie and a new partner, Erich Mendelsohn, a well-known German architect who had fled the Third Reich. In 1943, Hill was invited to showcase his work in MoMa's Five California Houses exhibition along with Richard Neutra, William Wurster and John Ekin Dinwiddie, which was to demonstrate the "highly characteristic architecture, indigenous to Western climate and living habits".

In 1947, Hill established his own practice in San Francisco, designing residences and commercial buildings for clients in the Bay Area and elsewhere in the US. In 1965, Hill made his long-time associate John Kruse partner, and continued their partnership as Hill & Kruse Architects.

According to SFGATE, Hill "helped define the woodsy Second Bay Tradition, which combined the rigors of the International Style with regional, vernacular influences".

The Hill & Kruse Collection at the Environmental Design Archives at UC Berkeley includes project files, drawings, and materials on Hill's ideas, thoughts, and influences on his designs.

References

External links 

Architects from California
1913 births
1984 deaths
Harvard Graduate School of Design alumni
20th-century American architects
UC Berkeley College of Environmental Design alumni
American expatriates in the United Kingdom